Artyom Igorevich Molodtsov (born 8 October 1990) is a Russian professional footballer. He plays for FC Sokol Saratov.

Club career
He made his professional debut in the Russian Second Division in 2007 for FC Saturn Yegoryevsk.

Molodtsov made his professional debut for FC Saturn Moscow Oblast on 14 July 2010 in the Russian Cup game against FC Sakhalin Yuzhno-Sakhalinsk.

He made his Russian Premier League debut for FC Amkar Perm on 13 March 2011 in a game against PFC CSKA Moscow.

References

External links
 

1990 births
Sportspeople from Saratov
Living people
Russian footballers
Russia youth international footballers
Association football defenders
Association football midfielders
FC Saturn Ramenskoye players
FC Amkar Perm players
FC Torpedo Moscow players
Russian Premier League players
FC Shinnik Yaroslavl players
FC Sokol Saratov players
FC Sakhalin Yuzhno-Sakhalinsk players
FC Mordovia Saransk players
FC Fakel Voronezh players